Brown Girl Dreaming is a 2014 adolescent verse novel by author Jacqueline Woodson.  It discusses the author's childhood as an African American growing up in the 1960s in South Carolina and New York. It was awarded the National Book Award for Young People's Literature, the Coretta Scott King Book Award, and an NAACP Image Award for outstanding literary work.

Plot
Jacqueline is born on February 12, 1963, in the city of Columbus, Ohio, and named after her father, Jack. While Jackie's first year is spent in the North, several trips are made to the South for Mary Ann (her mother) to visit her parents, Grandpa Gunnar and Grandma Georgiana, who live in the Nicholtown area of Greenville, South Carolina. The region is segregated and Jackie doesn't understand why she always goes. Her parents' very different feelings about the South cause arguments between them. Eventually, Jack and Mary Ann split up, and Mary Ann and her three children, Hope, Odella, and Jackie, move south to live with Grandpa Gunnar and Grandma Georgiana.

Jackie comes to love Greenville. While racism and segregation exist there, the place is still home to her and her grandparents. They believe in peaceful marches for civil rights. They know that God will bless them for doing the right thing.

Despite the widespread animosity, there are white people in Greenville who are respectful and treat Jackie and her family like actual human beings, rather than dirt. One such woman is the owner of the local laundromat store, who has known Grandma Georgiana for years. Mary Ann, however, wants to move back North. So, she travels to New York City to get settled. Jackie and her siblings stay on with their grandparents, relishing the time they have with them until Mary Ann comes to retrieve her children, with a brand new baby boy named Roman in tow.  They move in with Mary Ann's sister Caroline Irby (Aunt Kay), but Aunt Kay dies and the family of five is left alone.

In New York, Jackie becomes best friends with a girl from Puerto Rico named Maria. She also decides that she wants to become a writer after encouragement from her teacher. Each summer, Jackie and her siblings return to South Carolina to visit their grandparents. However, each time they find Grandpa Gunnar, a heavy smoker, sicker and sicker. Mary Ann's brother gets sent to prison after getting in trouble with the police, during which time he converts to Islam. About the same time, Jackie and Maria start to love Angela Davis of the Black Panther movement. They imitate Angela, though they have no real idea about the revolution in which she is involved. Not long after, Grandpa Gunnar dies of cancer, and Grandma Georgiana moves up to New York to be with Mary Ann and the grandchildren.

Awards
National Book Award for Young People's Literature
Coretta Scott King Award
NAACP Image Award for Outstanding Literary Work in Young Adult Fiction
Newbery Honor Book

References

2014 American novels
2014 children's books
Newbery Honor-winning works
Coretta Scott King Award-winning works
African-American young adult novels
Verse novels
Novels set in South Carolina
Novels set in New York (state)
Novels set in the 1960s
Novels by Jacqueline Woodson
Penguin Press books